Leatherhead railway station is in Leatherhead, Surrey, England. It is managed by Southern, with services provided by them and South Western Railway.

Two train operating companies serve the station due to its location at the junction of the Victoria or London Bridge  Horsham via Dorking line  and the Waterloo - Guildford line via Wimbledon, Leatherhead and Effingham Junction on the New Guildford Line.  Both are secondary routes to the major towns. The two lines were originally constructed and owned by separate railway companies. From 1923 until 1948 they were under the same ownership as part of the Southern Railway. Following nationalisation in 1948 the routes were operated as part of British Railways until 1996.

History

The London and South Western Railway (LSWR) Company supported a proposed Wimbledon and Dorking Railway (WDR), that proposed connecting the named towns via , partly as the company wanted a share of the lucrative Epsom race traffic. In 1857, before the scheme could be approved, the independent Epsom and Leatherhead Railway (ELR) was incorporated, pre-empting the central part of the WDR route.
When the truncated northern part of the WDR from Wimbledon to Epsom opened on 4 April 1859 it connected end-on to the ELR at their Epsom station.

The LBSCR connected to the ELR in 1859 by extending from their existing Epsom terminus, which was renamed "Epsom Town". The junction was at the north end of the ELR’s station. The  LBSCR did not have access to the platforms of the station which were used exclusively by LSWR services.  A year after opening the ELR was acquired by the LSWR, but operated by a Joint Committee of the LSWR and LBSCR.

In 1863 the company was vested jointly in the LSWR and LBSCR by Act of Parliament.  
Initially  the companies shared the stations at Ashtead and Leatherhead, but maintained separate stations at Epsom.

The LBSCR built a new, separate station to serve Leatherhead located some 700m to the south of the former joint station. A fine 4 arch viaduct was constructed across the River Mole, carrying the line to Dorking. It is Grade II listed.

The  original ELS station continued to be used by the LSWR until 2 February 1885 when a new station located further south and to the south west of the LBSCR station was opened. The new LSWR station was a single storey brick built structure in a neo-classical Italianate style, typical of the company’s  designs of the 1880s. It replaced a smaller structure that lay to the north of Kingston Road that served the original ELS station. The original engine shed survived until the 1980s. For many years through the 1970s and 80s it was used as a workshop by Ryebrook Motors.

The LSWR constructed an extension from Leatherhead to join the New Guildford Line (from Surbiton via Cobham to Guildford) at  running via Bookham. It opened on 2 February 1885. A curving 5 arch viaduct was built to cross the River Mole just to the south west of the station and north of the engine shed.

Under the grouping of 1923, the LBSCR and LSWR became part of the Southern Railway.  The lines through Leatherhead were electrified in 1925, third rail services starting between Waterloo and Dorking (North) and Bookham and the Guildford New Line on 12 July.

The duplication of stations serving the town ended in 1927 when the line from Guildford was diverted to join the LBSCR line to the south of the LBSCR station, entailing the construction of a new bridge across Station Road. The LBSCR station continues to serve all trains today.

The LSWR station was closed with all trains using the LBSCR station from 10 July 1927.) The engine shed and facilities were closed and demolished. The LSWR station’s running lines were used for EMU/carriage berthing until the mid 1970s.  The station buildings gradually fell into disrepair.  The use of the truncated running lines as sidings ceased and the tracks were  finally removed in the 1980s. The up station buildings were demolished and offices built on the site and part of the approach road. Part of the covered  steps up from road level to down platform level remain in a derelict state (2020).

The LBSCR stationmaster's house, an integral part of the main up side buildings, is now in use as the Archive and Library of The Railway Correspondence & Travel Society.

In the 1930s, it was planned to build a new loop line from Motspur Park on the LSWR Raines Park - Leatherhead line. The branch opened on 29 May 1938 from Motspur Park to Tolworth, with an intermediate station at Malden Manor, and to Chessington North and Chessington South on 28 May 1939. However the outbreak of World War II halted construction. The establishment of the Metropolitan Green Belt around London, first proposed by the Greater London Regional Planning Committee in 1935, and the subsequent designation of Ashtead Common as a Site of Special Scientific Interest in 1955, led to the abandonment of the line’s extension. It continues to operate to Chessington South as the Chessington Branch Line. Parliamentary powers for the Chessington South - Leatherhead line lapsed in 1962. Land through North Leatherhead reserved for the railway was subsequently used for a small section of route of the M25 motorway and its junction with the A243.

Ticket barriers were installed in 2011.

Architecture
The present station is a Grade II listed building. It was designed by Charles Driver in a Neo-Romanesque style and constructed in red brick with stone and polychrome brick dressings, and red tile roofs. The up side range of buildings include the station master's house with Italianate tower, ticket office and booking hall. The down side buildings include   waiting rooms, goods rooms and an extensive screen wall.  A passenger subway links the two ranges of buildings.

Services

Services at Leatherhead are operated by Southern and South Western Railway using  and   EMUs.

The typical off-peak service in trains per hour is:
 2 tph to  via 
 2 tph to  via 
 1 tph to 

On Saturday evenings (after approximately 18:45) and on Sundays, there is no service south of Dorking to Horsham.

London Buses route 465 serves the station and Surrey County Council provide a list of bus services grouped under 'Dorking, Leatherhead, Epsom and Banstead bus timetables'.

Notes

References

External links 

Railway stations in Surrey
Former London, Brighton and South Coast Railway stations
Former London and South Western Railway stations
Railway stations in Great Britain opened in 1867
Railway stations in Great Britain closed in 1927
Railway stations served by Govia Thameslink Railway
Railway stations served by South Western Railway